Chipatoli Union is a union in Hathazari Upazila, Chittagong District, Bangladesh. It has an area of 1,092 acres (4.42 km2) and, as of the 1991 census, a population of 6,959. There are two villages in the union, Chipatali and Kazirkhil, and one mouza. Chipatali Madrasha, Eidgah Multilateral High School and College, five government primary schools and a few Islamic institutions are located in the area.

References

Unions of Hathazari Upazila